Christopher Coyne may refer to:
 Christopher J. Coyne (born 1958), bishop of the Roman Catholic Diocese of Burlington, Vermont
 Christopher Coyne (professor) (born 1977), professor of economics
 Chris Coyne (born 1978), Australian (soccer) footballer
 Chris Coyne, Internet entrepreneur who co-founded the websites OkCupid, keybase and SparkNotes

See also
Coyne (surname)